Lincoln Highway is a highway in South Australia which links the cities of Port Augusta and Port Lincoln located on the east coast of Eyre Peninsula over a distance of . Lincoln Highway - along with Flinders Highway - presents an alternative but somewhat longer coastal route between Ceduna and Port Augusta, compared to the more direct route along Eyre Highway. It is designated route B100.

Route
After leaving Port Augusta, the highway passes through hot and arid saltbush-covered and scrub terrain. It soon passes through the largest and most significant town along the route, which is the steel city of Whyalla. Continuing southwest it connects with such coastal towns as Cowell, Port Neill and Arno Bay which have good fishing spots. The terrain here is interspersed with broad-acre grain cropping in suitable localities, and the scenery gets greener the more it heads southwest towards Port Lincoln.

Sealed with bitumen, it has many straight stretches with few steep inclines or declines, and for the most part has a 110 km/h speed limit. It has one lane in each direction, with few overtaking lanes. The highway runs along the eastern coast of the Eyre Peninsula but just so far inland as to allow only glimpses of the Gulf in certain places.

Port Lincoln itself is a prosperous fishing port and an important grain terminal serving the Eyre Peninsula wheatbelt.

History
The first Europeans to traverse most of this route, in April 1840, were Governor Gawler and John Hill, who explored on horseback from Port Lincoln to the Middleback Range near the location of the site of Whyalla.

The South Australian government decreed "the road from Port Augusta to Port Lincoln will be known as the Lincoln Highway", taking effect on 1 July 1938.

Major junctions

See also

 Highways in Australia
 List of highways in South Australia
 Flinders Highway, South Australia

References

Highways in South Australia
Eyre Peninsula